Some airports that Eastern Air Lines served before ending operations on January 18, 1991. (Eastern flew to dozens more cities at one time or another — into the 1960s they flew to Rutland VT, Bowling Green KY, Anderson SC, Charleston SC, Hartford CT and many more.)

Americas

Caribbean
 
 Oranjestad
 
 Freeport
 Nassau (Ionosphere Club)
 West End
 
 Port au Prince
 
 Kingston
 Montego Bay
 
 St. Maarten
 
 Port of Spain

Central America
 
 San Jose de Costa Rica
 
 Punta Cana
 Santo Domingo
 
 Guatemala City
 
 Acapulco
 Cancun
 Cozumel
 Guadalajara
 Mazatlan
 Mérida
 Mexico City
 Puerto Vallarta
 
 Managua
 
 Panama City (Ionosphere Club)

North America
 
 St. George's
 
 Montreal
 Ottawa
 Toronto
 Vancouver

 
 Akron/Canton
 Albany
 Allentown/Bethlehem/Easton, Pennsylvania
 Atlanta [Hub] (Ionosphere Club)
 Baltimore (Ionosphere Club)
 Birmingham
 Boston (Ionosphere Club)
 Buffalo
 Charleston, SC
 Charlotte/Douglas [Hub] (Ionosphere Club)
 Chicago - Midway & O'Hare (Ionosphere Club) 
 Cincinnati
 Cleveland - Hopkins
 Columbia, SC
 Columbus
 Corpus Christi
 Dallas/Fort Worth
 Daytona Beach
 Detroit - Metro & Willow Run 
 Denver - Stapleton
 El Paso
 Evansville
 Flint
 Fort Lauderdale (Ionosphere Club)
 Fort Myers
 Gainesville, Florida
 Grand Rapids
 Greensboro (Ionosphere Club)
 Harrisburg
 Hartford
 Houston - Intercontinental (Ionosphere Club) & Hobby
 Huntsville
 Indianapolis
 Jackson, Mississippi
 Jacksonville
 Kansas City (Ionosphere Club)
 Las Vegas
 Los Angeles
 Louisville
 Mayagüez
 Melbourne, Florida
 Memphis, TN
 Montgomery, AL
 Miami [Hub] (Ionosphere Club)
 Milwaukee
 Minneapolis/St. Paul
 Mobile
 Nashville
 Newark (Ionosphere Club)
 Norfolk
 New Orleans (Ionosphere Club)
 New York City - JFK [Hub] & LaGuardia (Ionosphere Club at both)
 Omaha
 Orlando (Ionosphere Club)
 Ocala
 Pensacola
 Peoria
 Philadelphia (Ionosphere Club)
 Phoenix
 Pittsburgh (Ionosphere Club) 
 Ponce
 Portland (Inaugurated service June 13, 1967)
 Providence
 Raleigh/Durham (Ionosphere Club)
 Reno
 Richmond
 Roanoke, Virginia
 Rochester
 Salt Lake City
 San Antonio
 San Francisco (Ionosphere Club) 
 San Juan [HUB] (Ionosphere Club)
 Sarasota/Bradenton 
 Saint John, U.S. Virgin Islands 
 Saint Thomas, U.S. Virgin Islands
 Savannah, GA
 Seattle - Tacoma
 St. Croix
 St. Louis (Ionosphere Club)
 St. Petersburg
 Syracuse
 Tallahassee
 Tampa (Ionosphere Club)
 Titusville, Florida 
 Toledo
 Vero Beach, Florida
 Washington - National [Hub] (Ionosphere Club)
 West Palm Beach (Ionosphere Club)
Wilkes Barre/Scranton

South America

 
 La Paz
 
 Rio de Janeiro
 São Paulo
 
 Santiago de Chile
 
 Barranquilla
 Bogotá (Ionosphere Club)
 Cali
 
 Guayaquil
 Quito
 
 Asuncion
 
 Lima (Ionosphere Club)

Europe
 
 London - Gatwick

References 

Eastern Air Lines
Eastern Air Lines